American singer and songwriter Haley Reinhart has released four studio albums, two extended plays, 20 singles (including seven promotional and two featured singles), and has made 18 appearances as a featured or guest vocalist, most notably for her role as a recurring performer with the jazz collective Postmodern Jukebox.

Reinhart's first studio album, Listen Up!, was released on May 22, 2012, following the release of the lead single "Free". After being dropped by her label, Interscope at the end of 2012, Reinhart independently released the single "Show Me Your Moves" in 2014, with the help of crowdfunding website Indiegogo. Her second studio album, Better followed in 2016, being released on April 29. Better spawned the lead single, "Better", as well as Reinhart's most successful single release to date, a cover of the Elvis classic "Can't Help Falling in Love" which was the first promotional single for the album. The single was certified Gold by the Recording Industry Association of America on February 17, 2017.

Reinhart's third studio album, What's That Sound?, was released on September 22, 2017, by Concord Records. The lead single, "Baby It's You", was released on June 16, 2017, followed by "For What It's Worth" on August 11, 2017 and "Let's Start" on September 19, 2017. "The Letter" was also released on July 13, 2017, as a promotional single. Reinhart was a featured collaborator on Irvin Mayfield and Kermit Ruffins's album A Beautiful World, released on October 13, 2017. She sings on the track "Don't Worry, Be Happy" with Jason Marsalis, Cyril Neville and Glen David Andrews, and the title track, "Beautiful World [for Imani]". She also provides uncredited vocals on the song "Mystic", and backing vocals throughout the album.

On May 31, 2018, Refinery29 exclusively debuted the music video for Reinhart's single "Last Kiss Goodbye" before its official release on June 1, 2018. Reinhart joined jazz pianist Jeff Goldblum as a featured singer on his debut album of jazz standards, The Capitol Studios Sessions, which was released on November 9, 2018. She features on the tracks "My Baby Just Cares for Me" and "Gee Baby (Ain't I Good to You)".

Reinhart teamed up with the Dutch electronic dance music duo Vicetone on their single "Something Strange", which was released with its video on November 2, 2018. On September 14, 2018, Reinhart released "Don't Know How to Love You", the lead single from her self-produced fourth studio album, Lo-Fi Soul, which was released independently on March 27, 2019. The title track, "Lo-Fi Soul", was released as the album's second single on February 8, 2019, with the official music video, composed of home footage, debuting on February 15 exclusively by AltPress. The third single, "Honey, There's the Door", was released with its official music video on March 8, 2019.

Reinhart has also had success on the Jazz Digital charts with her releases as part of Postmodern Jukebox. Six of the eight singles released with the band have been in the top 20, including her most successful single, a remake of Radiohead's "Creep", which peaked at number 1 on the chart dated May 25, 2015, and appeared on the chart for 58 consecutive weeks.

As a songwriter, Reinhart has written songs that have appeared on albums by Christina Grimmie, Martina Stoessel, Jennie Lena and Vicetone.

Studio albums

Extended plays

Singles

As lead artist

As featured artist

Promotional singles

Other appearances

Songwriting credits

References 

Discographies of American artists
Pop music discographies
Rock music discographies